Yannick Deichmann (born 13 August 1994) is a German professional footballer who plays as a midfielder for 1860 Munich.

Career
In May 2016, Deichmann signed for 3. Liga side VfR Aalen.

On 18 June 2021 it was announced that Deichmann had signed with 3. Liga side 1860 Munich.

References

External links
 

German footballers
1994 births
Living people
Footballers from Hamburg
Association football midfielders
FC St. Pauli players
VfR Aalen players
VfB Lübeck players
TSV 1860 Munich players
Regionalliga players
2. Bundesliga players
3. Liga players